The Sacramento River Fox Train, formerly the Yolo Shortline Railroad Company, is a common carrier railroad company that runs special excursions within West Sacramento, California.

They run libation excursions, family-friendly holiday excursions, and also operate the Sacramento Railbikes. Their most popular excursions are the Beer Train, Old Vine Express wine tasting train, and the Magical Christmas Train. 

The River Fox Train is owned by Sierra Railroad and operates under the Sierra Northern Railway now.

The route was originally a branch line of the Sacramento Northern Railroad, a Western Pacific Railroad subsidiary.

See also
Sacramento Southern Railroad—which operates excursions across the Sacramento River from the RiverTrain
List of heritage railroads in the United States

External links

Book Tickets Online
Railroad's website
Sierra Railroad's website
West Sacramento Station is at 
Woodland Station is at 

Heritage railroads in California
Transportation in Yolo County, California
Tourist attractions in Yolo County, California